Shyam Bihari Ram is an Indian politician. He was elected to the Bihar Legislative Assembly from Chenari constituency of Bihar in the 2010 Bihar Legislative Assembly election as a member of the Janata Dal (United).

References

Living people
Janata Dal (United) politicians
People from Rohtas district
Bihar MLAs 2010–2015
Bharatiya Janata Party politicians from Bihar
Bahujan Samaj Party politicians from Bihar
Year of birth missing (living people)